Smerinthulus myanmarensis is a species of moth of the  family Sphingidae. It is known from Malaysia and Myanmar.

References

Smerinthulus
Moths described in 2000